The Bayer designation η Coronae Australis (Eta Coronae Australis) is shared by two stars, in the constellation Corona Australis:
η1 Coronae Australis, HR 7062, HD 173715
η2 Coronae Australis, HR 7068, HD 173861

Coronae Australis, Eta
Corona Australis